The 2019 FIBA Under-16 Women's Asian Championship was originally to be the qualifying tournament for FIBA Asia at the 2020 FIBA Under-17 Women's Basketball World Cup. The tournament would have been held in Canberra, Australia from 5 to 10 April 2020. The top four teams would have represented FIBA Asia to the Under-17 Women's Basketball World Cup in Romania. However, it was canceled by FIBA due to the coronavirus pandemic in China. Instead, it was determined by the FIBA World Ranking.

Qualified teams 
For Division A:

 Semifinalists of the 2017 FIBA Under-16 Women's Asian Championship:
  (Hosts)
 
 
 

 5th-7th Placers of the 2017 FIBA Under-16 Women's Asian Championship:
 
 
 

 Division B winners at the 2017 FIBA Under-16 Women's Asian Championship:
 

For Division B:

 3rd-4th Placers of the 2018 FIBA Under-15 Women's Oceania Championship:
 
 
 Six (6) teams from FIBA Asia on a first-come first-registered basis, eventually were left unnamed.

References

External links
 2019 FIBA Under-16 Women's Asian Championship

2019
2020 in women's basketball
2019–20 in Asian basketball
basketball
2019
2019–20 in Australian basketball
Bask
Sports competitions in Canberra
April 2020 sports events in Asia
Basketball events cancelled due to the COVID-19 pandemic